Riley Park is an urban park in Calgary, Alberta, Canada. It is located in the neighbourhood of Hillhurst, bounded by 8th Ave. NW, 10th St. NW, 5th Ave. NW and 12th St. NW. The park plays is host to Calgary's Cricket Leagues and Calgary Concert Band holds free concerts in the park during summer. Amenities include a wading pool and playground.

History
The park was once part of a 146,000 hectare parcel of land known as Cochrane Ranch. The area was homesteaded between 1888 and 1909 by the Riley family, and willed to the City of Calgary following the death of the family's patriarch, Ezra Riley. The 20 acres parcel that is now Riley Park was donated to the city in 1910.

Sports
The park boasts of two cricket grounds, these grounds are Calgary & District Cricket League's flagship grounds. Its venues have been very historical for Canadian cricket, as the grounds have hosted cricket from the days Cricket was The National sport of the nation. The grounds have played host to a number of high-profile teams, including Australians, Marylebone Cricket Club,  U.S.A., and Yorkshire.

Location 
Riley Park is located next to Kensington, Calgary. It is on the north side of the Bow River and south of the Alberta College of Art and Design.

Attractions

Features 
Cricket pitch
Senator Patrick Burns Memorial Rock Gardens 
Wading pool
Gardens near 10th St. entrance
Picnic sites
Playground
Washrooms (seasonal)
Water fountains (seasonal)
Concession

External links

References

Cricket grounds in Canada